Antonio Calderón Burgos (born 2 June 1967) is a Spanish football coach and a former attacking midfielder. He is an assistant manager of the Belgian Challenger Pro League club Deinze.

Over eight seasons, he amassed La Liga totals of 215 games and 18 goals, for Cádiz, Mallorca and Rayo Vallecano. He also played more than 200 matches in Segunda División, in a professional career which lasted 18 years and ended in Scotland.

Calderón started a managerial career in the 2000s, working in both countries and with several teams.

Playing career
Born in Cádiz, Andalusia, Calderón made his senior and La Liga debut with hometown's Cádiz CF, in the 1986–87 season. In 1989, he signed with RCD Mallorca also in the top division, spending two years there.

Calderón then joined Madrid's Rayo Vallecano, helping the team promote from the Segunda División in his debut campaign with a career-best nine goals in 36 games; during his spell with the club, he would experience one relegation and another promotion. He finished his career in Spain with UE Lleida of the second division, eventually amassing totals of 416 matches and 49 goals across the two major tiers of Spanish football.

Aged 33, Calderón moved abroad, playing half a season with Airdrieonians and one and a half with Kilmarnock, his debut for the latter being a start against Dunfermline Athletic (2–1 home win) and his first and only goal occurring in a 3–1 away loss to Rangers. In 2002 he stayed in Scotland, retiring at Raith Rovers where he acted as player-coach.

Coaching career
Calderón continued his coaching career in his country, first briefly managing first professional club Cádiz as it was not finally able to prevent division-two relegation. He then signed with SD Huesca, recently promoted to precisely that league. With him in charge for the full campaign, they finished in a comfortable 11th position.

In 2009–10, Calderón repeated the feat; 13th place, although only two points clear of the relegation zone. In July 2010 he moved to another side in the second tier, Albacete Balompié. In February of the following year, with the Castile-La Mancha team ranking 19th out of 22, eventually suffering relegation, he was fired.

In July 2011, Calderón signed for CD Tenerife in the third division. On 22 January of the following year, following a 2–3 home defeat against Sporting de Gijón B, he was relieved of his duties, as the Canarians were ultimately not promoted.
 
For 2012–13, Calderón returned to Huesca which was still in the second tier. He was sacked after a 4–0 loss at UD Las Palmas in December, and the club eventually dropped down to the third division after a five-year stay.

Calderón succeeded Raül Agné at third-tier Cádiz CF in March 2014. After taking them to the playoffs (eliminated by CE L'Hospitalet) his contract was renewed for another year in June. However, he was dismissed as soon as November for a poor run of results.

In October 2016, Calderón was appointed at CF Fuenlabrada of the third league after Josip Višnjić was fired. He again took the team from the Madrid outskirts to the post-season – 2–0 aggregate quarter-final loss to CF Villanovense – and was sacked in January 2018 after a ten-game winless run, despite still being in third place. 

Calderon moved to Egyptian Premier League newcomers Nogoom FC in August 2018. He left Giza for personal reasons in September, and in October he was back in his country's third division with Salamanca CF UDS. A day after saving the side from the drop with a 12th-place finish, he resigned in May 2019.

On 16 December 2019, Calderón joined Real Balompédica Linense also in the third tier. He left on a mutual agreement in May 2021, after qualifying them to Primera División RFEF.

Managerial statistics

Honours
Airdrieonians
Scottish Challenge Cup: 2000–01

Raith Rovers
Scottish Football League Second Division: 2002–03
Fife Cup: 2003–04

References

External links

Stats and bio at Cadistas1910 

1967 births
Living people
Spanish footballers
Footballers from Cádiz
Association football midfielders
La Liga players
Segunda División players
Cádiz CF players
RCD Mallorca players
Rayo Vallecano players
UE Lleida players
Scottish Premier League players
Scottish Football League players
Airdrieonians F.C. (1878) players
Kilmarnock F.C. players
Raith Rovers F.C. players
Spain under-21 international footballers
Spanish expatriate footballers
Expatriate footballers in Scotland
Spanish expatriate sportspeople in Scotland
Spanish football managers
Segunda División managers
Segunda División B managers
Tercera División managers
Segunda Federación managers
Cádiz CF B managers
Cádiz CF managers
SD Huesca managers
Albacete Balompié managers
CD Tenerife managers
CF Fuenlabrada managers
Salamanca CF UDS managers
Scottish Football League managers
Raith Rovers F.C. managers
Egyptian Premier League managers
Spanish expatriate football managers
Expatriate football managers in Scotland
Expatriate football managers in Egypt
Spanish expatriate sportspeople in Egypt